Sunidhi Chauhan is an Indian singer. Chauhan made her career debut at the age of 13, with the film Shastra. She rose to prominence after recording "Ruki Ruki Si Zindagi" from Mast (1999), ultimately winning the Filmfare RD Burman Award for New Music Talent and was nominated as the Best Female Playback Singer. Her second breakthrough was released in 2000, with the song "Mehboob Mere" which resulted in receiving another Filmfare nomination. Chauhan received her third Filmfare nomination with the energetic "Dhoom Machale" (2004) followed by two more nominations during the next year for "Kaisi Paheli" and "Deedar De".

2006 was one of the most successful years in her career, where she was bestowed with her first Filmfare award for her rendition of the song "Beedi" and further two nominations for "Soniye" and "Aashiqui Main". The following year, she was prominently recognized for the title song of Aaja Nachle (2007) and "Sajnaaji Vaari". Chauhan received her 12th Filmfare nomination with "Chor Bazaari" (2009) preceded by "Dance Pe Chance" (2008). In 2010, she received her second Filmfare award with the item song "Sheila Ki Jawani" and was nominated for international styled carnival song "Udi" (2010).

Annual Central European Bollywood Awards 
The Annual Central European Bollywood Awards are fan awards with the voters mostly from Germany, Austria and Switzerland. They are users of the Bollywood Forum belonging to the film website, organizer of the ACEBAs. Chauhan has received an award from two nominations.

BIG Star Entertainment Awards 
The BIG Star Entertainment Awards are presented annually by Reliance Broadcast Network Limited in association with Star India to honour personalities from the field of entertainment across movies, music, television, sports, theater and dance. Chauhan has received an award from six nominations.

Bhaskar Bollywood Awards
The Bhaskar Bollywood Awards are presented by Dainik Bhaskar for excellence in the Hindi film industry. Chauhan has received one nomination.

Filmfare Awards
The Filmfare Awards are one of the oldest and most prestigious Hindi film awards. They are presented annually by The Times Group for excellence of cinematic achievements. Chauhan received two awards from seventeen nominations.

Other than awards for Best Female Playback Singer, Chauhan received the Filmfare RD Burman Award for New Music Talent in 2001.

Filmfare Awards South
The Filmfare Awards South are presented by Filmfare Awards for the Tamil Telugu Kannada and Malayalam film industries. The awards were inaugurated in 1956 and include categories decided by an industry jury. These are considered to be the oscars of south India. she was nominated for two Telugu films oye and yeto vellipoindhi manasu along with a Kannada film haage summane.

Global Indian Film Awards
The Global Indian Film Awards was an awards ceremony for the Hindi film industry held in 2005 and 2007. Chauhan received an award from two nominations.

Global Indian Music Academy Awards
The Global Indian Music Academy Awards are presented annually by Global Indian Music Academy to honour and recognise Indian music. Chauhan has received an award from seven nominations.

Indian Telly Awards
The Indian Telly Awards is an annual award for excellence both on-screen and behind-the-scenes of television in India. Chauhan has received one nomination.

International Indian Film Academy Awards
The International Indian Film Academy Awards are presented annually by the International Indian Film Academy to honour excellence of cinematic achievements in the Hindi language film industry. Chauhan has received two awards from fourteen nominations.

Mirchi Music Awards
The Mirchi Music Awards are presented annually by Radio Mirchi to honour both artistic and technical excellence of professionals in the Hindi language film music industry of India. Chauhan has received an award from four nominations.

Screen Awards 
India's only accolade involved with the Executive Director and the Governor of the Academy of Motion Picture Arts and Sciences, The Screen Awards honour excellence of cinematic achievements in the Hindi language film industry. Chauhan has won two award from ten nominations.

Star Guild Awards 
The Star Guild Awards are presented by the Apsara Producers Guild to honour and recognise the professional excellence of their peers. Chauhan has received an award from nine nominations.

Zee Cine Awards 
The Zee Cine Awards are presented by Zee Network for the Hindi film industry. The awards were inaugurated in 1998 and include categories decided by public votes and an industry jury. The awards were not presented in 2009 and 2010, but were resumed from 2011. Chauhan has received an award from three nominations.

Vijay Awards
The Vijay Awards are presented by Vijay TV for the Tamil film industry. The awards were inaugurated in 2006 and include categories decided by public votes and an industry jury.

SIIMA Awards

Other awards and honours 

 2004: MTV Immies for Best Singer Female (Film) – "Dekh Le" (Munna Bhai M.B.B.S.)
 2009: Kelvinator GR8! FLO Women Award
 2009: Indian Television Academy–GR8! Women Achiever Awards – GR8! Women Achiever in Music – Sunidhi Chauhan
 2010: Big Star Indian Music Award for Best Visualized Song Track (Female) – "Udi" – Aishwarya Rai Bachchan & Sunidhi Chauhan
 2011: Massal Award for Best International Female Vocalist Award – Sunidhi Chauhan

Footnotes

References

External links 

Chauhan, Sunidhi